Agno may refer to:

Agno, Pangasinan
Agno, Switzerland
Agno River, Republic of the Philippines
Torrente Agno, a river in Province of Vicenza, Italy